Mountain View Airport , also known as Harry E. Wilcox Memorial Field, is a public airport located two miles (3 km) east of the central business district of Mountain View, a city in Stone County, Arkansas, United States. It is owned by the City of Mountain View.

Facilities and aircraft 
For the 12-month period ending January 31, 2005, the airport had 11,000 aircraft operations, an average of 30 per day: 95% general aviation and 5% military.

References

External links 

Airports in Arkansas
Transportation in Stone County, Arkansas
Buildings and structures in Mountain View, Arkansas